Nova's Dream is the fifth studio album by Canadian Rock musician Aldo Nova, released on November 18, 1997. It is a Rock, Prog Rock, Hard Rock and electronic album with some vocal effects and a variety of choirs.

Track listing 
All songs written by Aldo Nova

 "My Soul to Keep" – :55
 "Is There Anybody There?" – 3:35
 "Dreamwalk" – 4:01
 "Are You Inexperienced?" – 1:46
 "Excuse Me While I Scream!!!" – 6:30
 "The Pressure's Killing Me" – 1:01
 "Pressure Cooker" – 4:53
 "Falling Back/An Angel Whispered" – 4:32
 "Freedom" – 9:18
 "Where Am I Now?" – :22
 "Elaye" – 5:57
 "Dada" – :06
 "Coming Home" – 4:39
 "Lighting Up" – :09
 "Mary Jane" – 1:51
 "Carlito's Way" – 5:18
 "Wake Up!!!" – 1:02
 "The End" – 6:19

Production 
 Produced By: Aldo Nova
 Engineered By: Aldo Nova
 Mixed By: Jeff Nystrom
 Coordinated By: Bob Telaro

Personnel 
 Aldo Nova - vocals, lead and rhythm guitars, bass guitar, keyboards, synthesizers
 Dennis Chartrand - synthesizer, strings, keyboards, accordion
 Jeff Smallwood - guitar
 Tino Izzo - acoustic guitar
 Jeff Smallwood - guitar
 Sylvain Bolduc - bass, fretless bass
 Andre Proulx - violin
 Voices of Africa - backing vocals
 Violaine Corradi - backing vocals
 Nancy Martinez - backing vocals

References 

Aldo Nova albums
1997 albums
Albums produced by Aldo Nova
Concept albums
Instrumental albums